Kenneth John Braithwaite II (born 1960) is an American politician, diplomat, businessman and naval officer who served as the 77th secretary of the Navy from May 29, 2020, to January 20, 2021, in the Donald Trump administration. Prior to that, he served as the U.S. ambassador to Norway, beginning February 8, 2018. Braithwaite is a retired U.S. Navy one-star rear admiral, having served in the Iraq War.

Early life and education
Braithwaite was born on December 24, 1960, and is from Livonia, Michigan. He attended the United States Naval Academy and graduated with a bachelor's degree in naval engineering and political science in 1984. He later earned a master's degree in government administration from the University of Pennsylvania, Fels Institute of Government, in 1995.

Braithwaite obtained additional graduate qualifications from the Naval War College in Newport, Rhode Island, as well as the Air Command and Staff College at the Maxwell Air Force Base in Montgomery, Alabama.

From 1993 to 1996, Braithwaite was town councilman for the borough of Ridley Park, Pennsylvania. He later became a top advisor for former U.S. Senator Arlen Specter of Pennsylvania from 1997 to 2000, serving as his state director.

Military career

Braithwaite was commissioned as an ensign in 1984, and was initially selected as a special assistant in the Office of Legislative Affairs on Capitol Hill. He became a naval aviator in April 1986 and was assigned to anti-submarine patrol missions with Patrol Squadron 17 out of Naval Air Station Barbers Point, Hawaii. In April 1988 he was reassigned to public affairs duties as director of public affairs aboard the aircraft carrier , and in 1990 he became the chief of public affairs to the commander of Philadelphia Naval Shipyard. He made NATO deployments to the Mediterranean Sea and Indian Ocean in response to the start of the Gulf War.

Braithwaite's active duty service ended in 1993, but he immediately joined the Navy Reserve. From 1993 until 2002, he served in different roles with numerous commands, including the 6th Fleet, 7th Fleet, U.S. Pacific Fleet and Commander Carrier Group Two.

In 2002, he was selected as commanding officer of Navy Combat Camera Atlantic (Reserve) and during the 2003 invasion of Iraq, he was deployed with his command in support of combat operations. In 2004, he was selected as the director of the Joint Public Affairs Support Element-Reserve, part of Joint Enabling Capabilities Command. In this role, he commanded a 50-person joint public affairs expeditionary unit that was forward deployed to support Combatant Commanders in time of conflict. In 2005, he deployed to Islamabad, Pakistan to serve as the director of Strategic Communications, concurrently reporting to the commander for Disaster Response and to the U.S. ambassador to Pakistan.

He was nominated to the rank of rear admiral (lower half) in early 2007 while serving as director of the Joint Public Affairs Support Element at Norfolk. His promotion was approved by the U.S. Senate that June. He served as the Navy's vice chief of Information until his retirement in June 2011.

Business career

Upon leaving active duty in June 1993, Braithwaite enrolled at the University of Pennsylvania. Shortly thereafter he was hired by Atlantic Richfield (ARCO) as Manager of Operations where he managed a multi-disciplined, union-represented workforce. He was later assigned to ARCO's Washington DC office to work on regulatory affairs.

Cambridge Analytica
In January 2020, CBS News reported that Braithwaite may have had a business relationship with Cambridge Analytica before he became ambassador to Norway, as documents from the company showed that he had a one-year contract with the company beginning on November 1, 2016. Braithwaite denied having entered into a contract with Cambridge Analytica, saying he only conducted short-lived discussions with the company, only informally provided advice, and that he only entered into a non-disclosure agreement. CBS News noted that he was still required to disclose those ties.

Citizens for Responsibility and Ethics in Washington suggested that he had a conflict of interest when he presented the U.S. Ambassador's Award to Norwegian shipping magnate Thomas Wilhelmsen because Wilhelmsen's cousin and co-heir to the Wilhelmsen company Olympia Paus is married to Alexander Nix, the former CEO of Cambridge Analytica. Braithwaite denied that he had a conflict of interest.

Donald Trump administration

Braithwaite was nominated by President Donald Trump to serve as the U.S. ambassador to Norway. His nomination was confirmed by the U.S. Senate on December 21, 2017, by voice vote.

On November 24, 2019, after the firing of Richard V. Spencer, Trump said he would nominate Braithwaite to become the U.S. secretary of the Navy. He was formally nominated on March 2, 2020, confirmed by voice vote on May 21, and sworn in on May 29, 2020.

In his 8 months as Secretary of the Navy, Braithwaite incurred approximately $2.4 million in travel costs paid by taxpayer funds. At the time, other senior civilian staff reduced their travel due to the COVID-19 pandemic; Braithwaite travelled more than any other senior Pentagon civilian. The week prior to Joe Biden's inauguration, Braithwaite spent $232,000 to fly to Wake Island, a tiny atoll where no sailors or Marines are stationed. He spent more than $24,000 to attend the Army–Navy football game. He made more than one visit to Hawaii during his 8 months. Braithwaite defended his extensive travel at taxpayer expense, saying, "I submit it's impossible to lead men and women deployed around the world from behind a desk in Washington."

Awards and decorations
Braithwaite's personal awards include the Legion of Merit, Defense Meritorious Service Medal with Oak leaf cluster, Meritorious Service Medal, Navy and Marine Corps Commendation Medal with Combat “V”, Navy Achievement Medal, the Combat Action Ribbon and various other awards.

Personal life
Braithwaite has  one daughter, Grace, and one son, Harrison.

References

External links

Kenneth Braithwaite (US department of state)
Kenneth Braithwaite at U.S. Embassy in Norway
Biography U.S. Secretary of the Navy

|-

1960 births
Ambassadors of the United States to Norway
American businesspeople
Living people
Pennsylvania Republicans
Recipients of the Meritorious Service Medal (United States)
Trump administration personnel
United States Navy personnel of the Gulf War
United States Navy personnel of the Iraq War
United States Naval Academy alumni
United States Naval Aviators
United States Navy rear admirals
United States Secretaries of the Navy
University of Pennsylvania alumni